The Miracula Nynie Episcopi is an anonymously written 8th-century hagiographic work describing miracles attributed to Saint Ninian. It is considered a non-historical work, and copies are not widely extant.

It was used as a reference by Ailred of Rievaulx in composing his Vita Sancti Niniani in the 12th century, a document that was used by the politically ambitious Fergus of Galloway in resurrecting the long-defunct Bishopric of Galloway.

Edition and translations
Strecker, Karl (ed.). "Miracula Nynie Episcopi." In Poetae Latini Aevi Carolini 4.3, ed. Karl Strecker. MGH Antiquitates. Berlin: Weidmann, 1923 (first published: 1883). pp. 943–61. Available online from the Digital MGH.
MacQueen, Winifred W. (tr.). "Miracula Nynie Episcopi." In St. Nynia, edited by John MacQueen. Revised edition. Edinburgh: Polygon, 1990 (first published: 1961). pp. 88–101. Also published as:
MacQueen, Winifred W. (tr.). "Miracula Nynie Episcopi." Transactions of the Dumfriesshire and Galloway Natural History and Antiquarian Society 37 (1960). pp. 21–57
Márkus, Gilbert (tr.). "The Miracles of St Nynia the Bishop (c. 780?)." In The Triumph Tree: Scotland’s Earliest Poetry, 550–1350, edited by Thomas Owen Clancy. Edinburgh: Canongate, 1998. pp. 126–39.

References 

Christian hagiography